Research Quotient (RQ) is a measure of companies' innovation capability developed by Anne Marie Knott., Robert and Barbara Frick Professor of Business at Washington University in St. Louis.

Origins of RQ 
RQ was introduced by Knott in the 2008 article, “R&D Returns Causality: Absorptive Capacity or Organizational IQ”, but at the time was referred to as IQ (Innovation Quotient). Because IQ and innovation quotient were already in use commercially, Knott changed the name to RQ in subsequent work to avoid confusion. The motivating argument in the article was that the main prescription from absorptive capacity — that the more a company spends on R&D, the greater its ability to absorb spillovers from rivals’ R&D, seemed implausible. This is because the greater the R&D, the closer a company gets to the knowledge frontier. Accordingly, the less likely it is to need spillovers from rivals. Knott argued that the statistical significance of absorptive capacity (an interaction between company R&D and rival spillovers) in predicting returns, was likely an artifact of failing to account for differences in companies’ R&D capability. In other words, it wasn't that spending more led to higher returns, it was that companies have inherently different returns (RQ), and those with higher RQ spend more.

RQ Definition 
RQ is derived from the production function in economics, which defines the relationship between firm inputs and their output. The version seen in microeconomic textbooks typically considers the two main tangible inputs: capital and labor, and is written as follows:

Y = KαLβ

Where Y is output, K is capital and L is labor. The exponents, α and β, the output elasticity of capital and labor, respectively, characterize how productive each input is in generating output. A 1% increase in capital increases a firm's output α%; a 1% increase in labor increases a firm's output β%.

RQ is obtained by expanding the production function to include the two important intangible inputs: R&D and advertising.

Y = KαLβRγAδ

The raw measure for RQ, γ, is the output elasticity of R&D — the percentage increase in revenue from a 1% increase in R&D. It is obtained by random coefficients estimation of the production function, using eight year windows of financial data for all publicly traded companies. A historical database of company RQs is available for academic use through Wharton Research Data Services (WRDS).

To support intuition, γ is rescaled to match the human IQ scale. An RQ of 100 is the average across all US public firms engaged in R&D in 2010. The majority of firms (67%) have RQ's which fall between 85 and 115.

Interpreting RQ 
Since RQ relates revenues to R&D, a company can have higher RQ either by

 Generating numerous inventions and being moderately successful commercialization them, or 
 Generating fewer inventions and being particularly good at commercializing them.

Accordingly, a company which appears innovative based on its patent record, may not have a high RQ. Similarly, since RQ relates revenues to R&D, its link to product innovation is obvious. The role of product innovation is to increase revenues. What is less obvious is that RQ also captures process innovation. Process innovation is captured by lower tangible inputs for the constant revenues.

RQ and Optimal R&D 
The economic foundation for RQ also allows companies to compute the optimal level of their R&D, as the partial derivative of profits with respect to R&D:

Ri* = (aγi / (1-δ))1/(1-γi)

The Harvard Business Review article, “The Trillion Dollar R&D Fix” estimated that the top 20 US R&D spenders were leaving a trillion dollars of market capitalization on the table, by either overinvesting or underinvesting in R&D. While many people believe companies should increase their R&D investment, in fact, the vast majority of companies are overinvesting in R&D according to this equation.

Alternative measures of Innovation used by Companies 
While RQ was developed to solve problems of innovation measurement in academic studies, it has been adopted by companies to solve their problems as well. A 2011 article in Research-Technology Management  reports a lack of proper innovation measures to be a top problem for companies. R&D managers surveyed for the article identified measurement to be important for

 Justifying R&D investments to the CEO, the board, and investors, 
 Improving the efficiency of R&D, and 
 Estimating the value of R&D investment for future growth.

The issue wasn't dearth of measures — in fact the companies identified over 250 R&D metrics. Rather, the respondents had major concerns with each of them, including difficulty collecting the necessary data, lack of uniform standards across business units, susceptibility to being gamed to make a given group look good, and focusing on inputs or outputs, rather than the conversion of inputs to outputs, and meaninglessness to shareholders.

The most common innovation measures previously used by companies are:

Sales/R&D 
While capturing R&D productivity, this measure is coarse in that it implicitly attributes all sales to R&D. Moreover, it is the inverse of the most common means to setting the R&D budget (% of sales or R&D Intensity), so unlikely to be meaningful.

Patents 
Patents capture knowledge outputs, rather than commercial output, thus they are valuable largely to signal innovation is taking place. The link to commercial output is tenuous, since less than 50% of companies who conduct R&D patent their innovations. Moreover, patents and publications vary tremendously in their value. Finally, they are costly to file and maintain, which means less money for innovation itself.

Vitality Index: 
The vitality index is the third most popular R&D metric. It captures the fraction of revenues from products introduced in the past few years Companies vary on the period of years, though three years seems to be most common. While the measure does a good job of capturing product innovation, it doesn't capture process innovation or incremental innovation of existing products.

Holt’s Innovation Premium (IP) 
Holt's Innovation Premium is the basis of Forbes annual ranking of “The Worlds Most innovative companies”. While the full formula is proprietary, Holt's Innovation Premium, or IP captures the difference between a company's market capitalization and the net present value (NPV) of forecasted cash flows. IP therefore is a market based measure of a company's innovation. Accordingly, Jeff Dyer and Hal Gregersen, the authors of the Forbes article How We Rank The Most Innovative Companies 2018, report that it captures growth, but not subsequent returns to investors.

Alternative measures of Innovation used by Academics 
Aside from R&D itself, the main measures of innovation in the economics, finance and management literatures are patent-based measures and total factor productivity.

Patents 
Patent measures can take various forms, but the most meaningful form is patent intensity (patents/R&D). Patents can be captured as stocks or flows of either patents themselves or their citations. Use of citations, rather than patents themselves, is an effort to adjust for tremendous variance in patent value — 10% of patents account for 80% of the economic value of all patents (Sherer and Harhoff). The principal concern with patent measures for academic studies is that less than 50% of companies who conduct R&D patent their innovations. The norm in these studies is to treat zero patents as zero innovation.

Total Factor Productivity (TFP) 
Total Factor Productivity or TFP is the remainder in the firm production function after taking into account the contributions from tangible inputs. In that sense it mimics the Solow residual (technological progress) in growth accounting. One concern with TFP as a proxy for R&D productivity is it captures the contributions of all omitted variables. Accordingly, it doesn't isolate the effects of R&D

RQ and Firm Value 
The goal of company innovation is typically to increase market value. Because RQ is derived from the production function, it is straightforward to show analytically that increasing RQ increases market value. Empirical tests in the academic literature support that: contemporaneous and future market to book value (MTB) both increase with RQ, as do future monthly stock returns. Research for companies and investors is consistent with that: FCLT Global found that RQ was the second most important factor in predicting Return on Invested Capital (ROIC); MSCI reported that companies with high RQ ratings, returned better than companies with low RQ Ratings. CNBC, as part of its RQ50 rankings, provided case studies of how companies in the same industry differed when one was high RQ and the other low RQ.

RQ and Economic Growth 
Paul Romer’s theory of endogenous growth, for which he was awarded the Nobel Prize in 2018, holds that economic growth is proportional to the level of R&D and the productivity of R&D. Since industrial R&D comprises 70% of US R&D, it is not surprising that GDP growth tracks RQ. Cummings and Knott document a 65% decrease in mean company RQ over the period 1985-2015, which coincides with the decline in nominal GDP growth. This decline in RQ matches the decline in R&D productivity documented in Jones (1995)

Jones holds this decline is due to “fishing out” — the exhaustion of valuable ideas. When Romer's model is modified to accommodate fishing out, growth from innovation is exogenous, and converges to zero in the long run. Knott, in contrast, holds that the decline in RQ stems from companies becoming worse at R&D. She received two National Science Foundation grants to investigate the links between companies’ R&D practices and their RQs. The book “How Innovation Really Works” serves as a final report for companies documenting the ways in which they have become worse.

References 

Business intelligence terms
Indicators